Singles is a 1984 Australian miniseries about a 30 something woman having a series of relationships with men.

References

External links
Singles at IMDb

1980s Australian television miniseries
1984 Australian television series debuts
1984 Australian television series endings
1984 television films
1984 films
1980s English-language films